Emilio Alvarez (born January 16) is a religious leader in the United States, and founding bishop of the Union of Charismatic Orthodox Churches. He is also the founding director of the Institute for Paleo-Orthodox Christian Studies (formerly the certificate in Convergence Studies Program at New York Theological Seminary).

Biography 
Emilio Alvarez—born Emilio Alvarez Jr.—was reared in a Holiness-Pentecostal household, within the Church of God (Cleveland, Tennessee); he is the son of a bishop within the denomination. As a minister within the Church of God (Cleveland, Tennessee), Alvarez transitioned into the Convergence Movement after questioning his childhood denomination's anti-Catholicism.

In 2011, Alvarez was consecrated to the episcopacy as a bishop for the Communion of Evangelical Episcopal Churches. He was invited to attend an audience with Pope Francis in 2014; Alvarez served as official translator for the meeting, themed, "The Miracle of Unity".

In July 2019, Alvarez helped establish the Union of Charismatic Orthodox Churches within Painted Post, New York. He was unanimously elected as its interim presiding prelate, before being appointed primate. During his prelature in December 2020, he was hosted by Archbishop Elpidophoros of the Greek Orthodox Archdiocese of America.

In 2021, he was installed as archbishop and primate for the Union of Charismatic Orthodox Churches.

In 2022, Alvarez published Pentecostal Orthodoxy: Toward an Ecumenism of the Spirit through InterVarsity Press. He became an associate provost at Asbury Theological Seminary, relocating from Rochester, New York where he pastored The Cathedral at The Gathering Place.

Selected works 
 Pentecostal Orthodoxy: Toward an Ecumenism of the Spirit, 2022
 Pentecost: A Day of Power for All People, 2023

See also 
 Convergence Movement
 Paleo-orthodoxy

References

External links 
 Website of Emilio Alvarez
 Website of the Union of Charismatic Orthodox Churches

21st-century American bishops
African-American Christian clergy
Religious leaders from New York (state)
Writers from New York (state)
Convergence Movement
21st-century African-American people
Year of birth missing (living people)
Living people